The Type 140 Jaguar-class fast attack craft is an evolution of the German torpedo boats (E-boats) of World War II. The design was developed  by Lürssen and designated Schnellboot 55. The 20 boats that were built for the German Navy were in service from 1957 to 1975.

The Jaguar-class boats were relatively well suited for high sea action. In NATO strategy it was their duty to intercept landing operations in the Baltic Sea, prevent transfers of ships of the Soviet Union and to keep the transatlantic supply lines open through the North Sea.

The  differs from the Type 140 only in the model of engine.

List of boats

References

 Also published as 
Schnellboot Typ 140 Jaguar-Klasse @ schnellboot.net

Torpedo boat classes
Motor torpedo boats of the German Navy